Marcelo Pereira Moreira, commonly known as Pavão (born April 15, 1974), is a retired association footballer who played as a right back for several Brazilian Série A clubs.

Career
Born in Recife, Pavão started his professional career playing with São Paulo in 1993, being promoted from the youth team. With São Paulo, he played 24 Série A games without scoring a goal between 1993 and 1995. He left São Paulo in 1995, joining Atlético Paranaense in 1996. After playing for Rio Branco-SP and Atlético Goianiense respectively in 1996 and in 1997, he left Brazil to play for Austrian club Austria Lustenau
from 1997 to 1999, and Tenerife of Spain from 1999 to 2000. Pavão returned to his country in 2001 to play for Mogi Mirim in 2001, leaving the club in 2002 to defend Treze and retiring in the same year when playing for Brasiliense.

References

1974 births
Living people
Sportspeople from Recife
Brazilian footballers
Brazilian expatriate footballers
São Paulo FC players
Club Athletico Paranaense players
Rio Branco Esporte Clube players
Atlético Clube Goianiense players
CD Tenerife players
Mogi Mirim Esporte Clube players
Treze Futebol Clube players
Brasiliense Futebol Clube players
Expatriate footballers in Austria
Expatriate footballers in Spain
Association football defenders